Ushinosuke Mori (森 丑之助, January 16, 1877 – July 4, 1926) was a Japanese anthropologist and folklorist. He studied the aborigines of Taiwan.

Early life 
Mori was born in Kyoto. Following his graduation from Kumamoto Chinese school, in 1895 Mori went to Taiwan as a Chinese language army interpreter during the First Sino-Japanese war. He had expressed his desire to contribute to Japanese scholarship by studying the peoples of Taiwan.

Career 
For nine months in 1900, Mori participated in research as an interpreter and guide for anthropologist and University of Tokyo professor Ryuzo Torii, who was one of the first people to enter Taiwan after the Japanese took it over in 1895. From April 1908 to September 1910 he was commissioned to an old customs committee. By 1924, he was recorded as employed by the Governor-General of the National Taiwan Museum. While there, he conducted a survey of aboriginal residential districts throughout Taiwan.

Over the course of twenty years Mori built a collection of survey records, created numerous video recordings and photographs (some of which are on display in the National Taiwan Museum), and established a language laboratory. His work included over 100 scholarly articles. According to historians Ping-hui Liao and David Der-Wei Wang, several of Mori's works were widely read and considered to be handbooks for those interested in knowing about the aboriginies of Taiwan. 

In addition to its effect on other anthropologists, Mori’s work had some influence in the arts. For example, Chinese sculptor Huang Tushui was able to sculpt figures with Taiwanese features without having direct contact with the people themselves because he had access to Mori’s images. And the author Haruo Satō gained personal insights directly from Mori himself which were later incorporated into his realistic literary depictions of aborigines. At least one of Haruo's stories, Demon Bird, was directly inspired in by a passage from Mori's writings.

Mori also discovered many alpine plants and named more than 20 species. Among these species were Berberis aristatoserrulata and Berberis brevisepala, discovered in April 1910 on the Qing Dyansty Trail of the mountain of Guanmen-Shan. Although these two species were published in 1913 by Japanese botanist Bunzō Hayata, no botanist visited Guanmen after Mori until 2014, when an international expedition of botanists and hikers trekked there in an attempt to discover more about them. Guided by notes left behind by Mori, the expedition was successful and both species were found on the mountain trail.

In 1923 Mori was devastated by the Great Kantō earthquake, causing him to lose most of his research. In July 1926, at age 49, he disappeared in a boat returning to Japan and it is speculated that he committed suicide.

Legacy 
Historians Liao and Wang consider the legacy of Mori and Torii to be somewhat mixed. On one hand, their accounts and publications provide irreplaceable anthropological information about the aboriginies, as well as a wealth of detail about the natural landscape of Taiwan. On the other hand, government officials were able to use this information as they "exploited and oppressed the aboriginies under [their] 'civilizing barbarians' policy." Other historians note the same ambiguity. In fact, Mori himself understood his delicate position between the government (which was funding his work and also using his photographs for propaganda), which wanted to develop Taiwan for its natural resources, and the local populations, which were being treated inhumanely. Nevertheless, after the Tapani incident of 1915, in which great tensions followed a month-long uprising by Taiwanese Han and aboriginies against the Japanese government, Mori attempted to intervene using his expertise to provide a peaceful solution, but his assistance was rebuffed.

Bibliography 
台灣番族圖譜
台灣番族志 (unfinished)

See also
 List of unsolved deaths

References

External links
 Digital Museum of Taiwan Indigenous Peoples
 

1877 births
1926 deaths
1926 suicides
People from Kyoto
Japanese anthropologists
Suicides by drowning
Unsolved deaths